Himalopenetretus is a genus of ground beetles in the family Carabidae. There are at least three described species in Himalopenetretus.

Species
These three species belong to the genus Himalopenetretus:
 Himalopenetretus burangensis Yan; H.Shi & Liang, 2020  (China)
 Himalopenetretus falciger (Heinz & Ledoux, 1990)  (Pakistan)
 Himalopenetretus franzi (Zamotajlov & Sciaky, 1998)  (India)

References

Carabidae